Balineni Srinivasa Reddy (born 12 December 1964, Ongole, Andhra Pradesh, India) is an Indian politician and  Minister for Energy, forest & environment, science & technology in the state of Andhra Pradesh and Member of the Legislative Assembly from Ongole.

He is member of the YSR Congress Party and has represented the Ongole constituency for five terms. He also served as Minister of Mines & Geology, Handlooms & Textiles, Spinning Mills, Small Scale Industries in YSR second cabinet in  2009.

Personal
Balineni Srinivasa Reddy is a five times Member of Legislative Assembly (MLA) from Ongole, Andhra Pradesh.
Reddy is the son of B.Venkateswara Reddy. He is married to Sachi Devi (sister of Y V Subba Reddy (ex-MP)) and has one son B. Praneeth and his wife B. Sri Kavya (Pinky).
Balineni Srinivasa Reddy is a relative of former Chief Minister late Y S Rajasekhara Reddy & Chief Minister Y S Jagan Mohan Reddy.

Positions held
 2019 Minister of Energy, Environment, Forests, Science & Technology.
 District Youth Congress President, Prakasam District
 Minister for Handlooms & Textiles, Spinning Mills, Small Scale Industries
 MLA (Ongole)
 1999 - 2004 (INC) MLA Ongole 
 2004 - 2009 (INC) MLA Ongole
 2009 - 2012 (INC) MLA Ongole
 2012 – 2014 (YSR) MLA  Ongole
 2014 - 2019 (YSR) Defeated Ongole
 2019 - 2024 (YSR) MLA   Ongole
  YSR Congress Prakasam district president
2019 Minister of Energy; Forest and Environment; Science and Technology
 YSR Congress Regional Coordinator for Ongole , Bapatla , Nellore , Tirupathi ,YSR Districts.

References

Indian National Congress politicians from Andhra Pradesh
YSR Congress Party politicians
People from Ongole
1964 births
Living people
Telugu politicians
Andhra Pradesh MLAs 2019–2024